The lynching of Jay Lynch, age 28, took place in Lamar, Missouri, on May 28, 1919. The year 1919 saw 83 lynchings in the United States. Lynch was one of only four white men lynched in that year.

Jay Lynch
Jay Lynch had a long arrest record. Crimes he was accused of included burglary and robbery. In Oklahoma City he allegedly stole a car, and in Kansas City he allegedly stole $300 ($ in ) worth of women's silks. For almost a decade he was in and out of jail and escaped from prison several times. In 1918, he was hired on as a private detective of the Wabash Railroad in St. Louis. While working for the railway he was arrested for robbing a train. Lynch skipped bail on that charge and was later arrested near his sister's house near Lamar.

Murder
On March 3, 1919, while being held in Lamar in connection with the Wabash Railroad boxcar robbery in St. Louis, Lynch asked to use the jailhouse telephone. When Sheriff John Marion Harlow Jr. of Barton County opened his cell, Lynch fatally shot the sheriff with a gun he had earlier smuggled into the county jail. Harlow's son, Dick Harlow, heard the commotion and ran to save his father, but was also mortally wounded by Lynch and died a few days later. After shooting the sheriff and his son, Lynch fled the state and drove across the country. He was denied entry to Mexico and was arrested again in La Junta, Colorado, on May 13, 1919, and sent back to Missouri.

Lynch pleaded guilty to murder. As there was no death penalty in Missouri, he was sentenced to life in prison.

Lynching
Fearing violence from the packed courthouse, presiding judge B. G. Thurman had the prisoner taken into his private office after the verdict to say goodbye to Lynch's family. In his office were the judge; Lynch's wife, baby, mother, and sister; and several deputies assigned to guard the prisoner. While Lynch was holding his child, 24 people burst into the office and overpowered the armed guards. The men put a noose around Lynch's neck and dragged him out of the courthouse. The noose's rope was thrown over a tree branch, but when he was strung up, it broke under the weight. Another, sturdier branch was chosen, and Lynch was hanged in front of a cheering crowd.

Aftermath
The coroner's report listed the cause of Lynch's death as "at the hands of parties unknown". Prosecuting attorney H. W. Timmonds and sheriff W. A. Sewell of Barton County started an investigation into the lynching, but no charges were ever filed as no one was willing to identify the perpetrators.

The State of Missouri had abolished capital punishment in 1917. In large part due to the events surrounding Lynch's lynching, as well as the representative of Barton County, H. C. Chancellor, giving an impassioned speech calling for the death penalty; the punishment was quickly restored for seven crimes: treason, perjury, subornation of perjury, first-degree murder, rape, kidnapping, and train robbery. It was signed into law by Governor Frederick D. Gardner.

See also
 Lynching of Thurmond and Holmes

Bibliography

Notes

Citations

References 
 
 
  - Total pages: 228 
 
   
  - Total pages: 184

External links 
 

1919 in Missouri
1919 riots in the United States
May 1919 events
Riots and civil disorder in Missouri
White American riots in the United States
1919 deaths
1919 murders in the United States
Lynching deaths in Missouri
People from Missouri
People murdered in Missouri